Crowlas is a village in Cornwall, England, on the A30 about three miles east of Penzance. It forms a small conurbation with Ludgvan within the parish of the same name. The hamlet of Whitecross lies to the north. Details of the crosses at Crowlas and Whitecross are included in the article Ludgvan.
There are many small businesses, Chinese Takeway, shop, and the Star Inn pub has a good reputation for local beers. The Methodist Chapel in Chapel square is a modern friendly place that hosts many community activities.  
The local community radio station Coast FM broadcasts on 96.5 and 97.2 FM.

References

External links

Villages in Cornwall